Mohamed Haddouche is an Algerian chess grandmaster (2014) born in Sidi Bel Abbes on 19 August 1984.

Chess career
Haddouche is an eight-time winner of the Algerian Chess Championship, most recently in 2017.

He has represented his country in five Chess Olympiads: 2006, 2008, 2010, 2012 and 2014. He has won three medals in chess events at the African Games: gold and silver in 2003, and a second gold in 2007. He has also won three medals in chess events at the Pan Arab Games: silver and bronze in 2007, and gold in 2011.

He played in the Chess World Cup 2017, being defeated by Ding Liren in the first round.

He took second place at the 2018 Ivory Coast Rapid and Blitz Invitational.

He won the Arab Individual Chess Championship in Sharjah, UAE in 2018.

References

External links 

Mohamed Haddouche chess games at 365Chess.com

1984 births
Living people
Chess grandmasters
Algerian chess players
21st-century Algerian people
African Games medalists in chess
Competitors at the 2003 All-Africa Games
African Games gold medalists for Algeria
African Games silver medalists for Algeria
20th-century Algerian people